Chalconyx is a genus of moths of the family Noctuidae.

Species
 Chalconyx ypsilon Butler

References
Natural History Museum Lepidoptera genus database

Hadeninae